FC Politehnica II Timișoara was the reserve squad of FC Politehnica Timișoara. It was founded in 2005, and dissolved in 2012.

In the sixteenths-finals phase of the Romanian Cup 2006–07 edition Politehnica II played against their first team, Politehnica Timișoara, the game ending with a 3–1 loss for Politehnica II.

References

FC Politehnica Timișoara
Association football clubs established in 2005
Association football clubs disestablished in 2012
Defunct football clubs in Romania
Football clubs in Timiș County
Liga II clubs
Liga III clubs
2005 establishments in Romania
2012 disestablishments in Romania